Robert Ryland (March 14, 1805 – April 23, 1899) was the first president of Richmond College (now the University of Richmond), serving from 1840 to 1866.  Prior to the establishment of the college, he had served as the only superintendent of its predecessor institution, the Virginia Baptist Seminary, since 1832.

Ryland served as the first pastor for the First African Baptist Church of Richmond, Virginia from 1841 to 1865. The church is a prominent Black church founded in 1841, its members initially included both slaves and freedmen. It has since had a major influence on the local black community. At one point, it was one of the largest Protestant churches in the United States. Reverend Robert Ryland owned slaves himself and believed that slavery was the best way to convert Africans to Christianity.

Ryland Hall on the University of Richmond's campus is named in honor of both Robert Ryland and his nephew, Charles H. Ryland.

Family
Robert Ryland was born on March 14, 1805, at Farmington Plantation in King and Queen County, Virginia to Josiah and Catherine (née Peachy) Ryland. He had four brothers and two sisters.

In 1830, he married Josephine Norvell, daughter of Thomas and Ann Mosby Norvell. They had two sons and two daughters before Josephine died in 1846. Robert remarried in 1848 to Elizabeth Presley "Betty" Thornton (daughter of Anthony and Ann Thornton), with whom he had three daughters.

Professional life
Ryland received both bachelor's (1826) and master's (1829) from Columbian College (now The George Washington University). From 1841 to 1865, concurrent with his term as president of Richmond College, Ryland served as pastor of First African Baptist Church in Richmond.  In 1868, Ryland became president of Shelbyville Female College in Shelbyville, Kentucky.  He subsequently also served as president of female colleges in New Castle and Lexington, Kentucky.  From 1893 until 1897, he served as chaplain of the Southwest Virginia Institute in Bristol, Virginia.

References

External links
 History of the University of Richmond: People: Rev. Robert Ryland

1805 births
1899 deaths
Presidents of the University of Richmond
People from Shelbyville, Kentucky
People from New Castle, Kentucky
People from Lexington, Kentucky
American slave owners
George Washington University alumni